Bancroft is an unincorporated community in northeast Daviess County, in the U.S. state of Missouri. The community is 1.5 miles south-southeast of Gilman City in southeastern Harrison County.

History
Bancroft was laid out in 1859. A post office called Bancroft was established in 1867, and remained in operation until 1901.

References

Unincorporated communities in Daviess County, Missouri
Unincorporated communities in Missouri